The Râul Mare (also: Valea Prăpăstiilor) is a right tributary of the river Bârsa in Romania. It flows into the Bârsa in Zărnești.

References

Rivers of Romania
Rivers of Brașov County